The Sheffield Patent, dated January 1, 1623 (Julian calendar) is a land grant from Edmund Sheffield, 1st Earl of Mulgrave ( in the original) of England to Robert Cushman and Edward Winslow (residents of Plymouth Colony) and their associates.

Cape Ann was subsequently settled by members of the Dorchester Company, which was later absorbed into the Massachusetts Bay Company.

Notes

External links
 The Charter for the North Shore of Massachusetts Bay. known as the Sheffield Patent 1 January 1623 [Reprint].  - An image of a typeset version, hosted by the Library of Congress. The original copy of this version is reportedly in the possession of the Essex Institute of Salem, Massachusetts.
 Picture of the original, in the possession of the Phillips Library, Peabody Essex Museum.

Pre-statehood history of Massachusetts
History of the Thirteen Colonies